Instant Replay is the seventh studio album by the Monkees. Issued 11 months after the cancellation of the group's NBC television series, it is also the first album released after Peter Tork left the group and the only album of the original nine studio albums that does not include any songs featured in the TV show.

History
Although the Monkees had recorded dozens of tracks since the release of their last studio album, spring 1968's The Birds, The Bees & the Monkees (a soundtrack LP from their film Head had been released between the two studio LPs), several of the songs on Instant Replay actually dated from sessions up to two and a half years earlier.

The band's new music coordinator (and former road manager), Brendan Cahill, believed that releasing previously unused tracks recorded in 1966—prior to the group's seizing control of their own recording process—was the way for the group to regain commercial success. The album's lead single, "Tear Drop City," written by Tommy Boyce and Bobby Hart, was one of the songs taken from the vault and was identified by Michael Nesmith as their intended first single in 1966. The track was not a major hit, only managing to reach No. 56 on the U.S. charts, while reaching No. 34 in Australia. Despite the single's poor chart performance, the album charted on the Billboard Top 40 Albums chart at No. 32.

Micky Dolenz's "Just a Game" had originally been written during the sessions for the album Headquarters (1967), while Nesmith's "Don't Wait for Me" was the first released product of his 1968 sessions with Nashville studio musicians. Davy Jones' "You and I" featured guitar work from Neil Young.

Production notes

Two songs from these sessions, "A Man Without a Dream" and "Someday Man" (later issued as the B-side of the "Listen to the Band" single), were produced by Bones Howe and recorded at Wally Heider's Studio. Howe brought in Wrecking Crew musicians, including Tommy Tedesco (guitar), Joe Osborn (bass) and Hal Blaine (drums), and a nine-piece horn section. Despite having already quit the group, Peter Tork makes an appearance on this album by playing guitar on the 1966 outtake "I Won't Be the Same Without Her."

Track listing

Original 1969 Colgems vinyl issue
Side 1

Side 2

1995 Rhino CD reissue

Tracks 1-12: Original album

2011 Rhino Handmade deluxe CD reissue

In 2011, Rhino Handmade released an 89-track deluxe edition of Instant Replay. Disc 1 features stereo versions and various remixed versions. Disc 2 features mono released and unreleased versions. Disc 3 features alternate takes, backing tracks, and tapes from the television special 33⅓ Revolutions per Monkee. The 7-inch vinyl single has two songs sourced from acetate: alternate mixes of "I Go Ape" and "(I Prithee) Do Not Ask for Love".

Disc 1 (The Original Stereo Album)

Tracks 1-12: Original album in stereo

"Someday Man" (Single B-Side) (Nichols, Williams) - 2:42 
 "Carlisle Wheeling" (Alternate Stereo Mix) (Nesmith) - 3:17 
 "Mommy and Daddy" (1968 Stereo Mix) (Dolenz) - 1:59 
 "Look Down" (King, Stern) - 2:51 
 "If I Ever Get to Saginaw Again" (Keller, Russell) - 2:44 
 "Me Without You" (Alternate Stereo Mix) (Boyce, Hart) - 2:10 
 "Smile" (Jones) - 2:19 
 "Nine Times Blue" (Nesmith) - 2:11 
 "Shorty Blackwell" (Alternate Stereo Mix) (Dolenz) - 6:14 
 "St. Matthew" (Nesmith) - 2:43 
 "Some of Shelly's Blues" (1968 Stereo Mix) (Nesmith) - 1:51 
 "Hollywood" (1968 Stereo Mix) (Nesmith) - 2:17 
 "Don't Wait for Me" (Alternate 1968 Stereo Mix) (Nesmith) - 2:34 
 "Propinquity" (I've Just Begun to Care) (1968 Stereo Mix) (Nesmith) - 3:20 
 "The Crippled Lion" (1968 Stereo Mix) (Nesmith) - 2:50 
 "How Insensitive" (Jobim, de Moraes, Gimbel) - 2:31 
 
Disc 2 (Mono Mixes and Rarities)

 "Through the Looking Glass" (1968 Mono Mix) (Baldwin, Boyce, Hart) - 2:50 
 "Don't Listen to Linda" (1968 Mono Mix) (Boyce, Hart) - 2:50 
 "I Won't Be the Same Without Her" (1966 Mono Mix) (Goffin, King) - 2:41 
 "Just a Game" (Alternate Vocal - Mono Mix) (Dolenz) - 1:51 
 "Me Without You" (Fuzz Guitar Version - Mono Mix) (Boyce, Hart) - 2:10 
 "Don't Wait for Me" (Mono Mix) (Nesmith) - 2:33 
 "You and I" (1968 Mono Mix) (Chadwick, Jones) - 2:19 
 "While I Cry" (UK Mono Mix) (Nesmith) - 2:59 
 "Tear Drop City" (Mono Promo Single Mix) (Boyce, Hart) - 2:04 
 "A Man Without a Dream" (Mono Promo Mix) (Goffin, King) - 3:05
 "Someday Man" (1968 Mono Mix) (Nichols, Williams) - 2:49 
 "Hollywood" (Mono Mix) (Nesmith) - 2:16 
 "Mommy and Daddy" (1968 Mono Mix) (Dolenz) - 2:26 
 "You and I" (1968 Rough Mix) (Chadwick, Jones) - 2:25 
 "Carlisle Wheeling" (Alternate Vocal - 1969 Mono Mix) (Nesmith) - 3:15 
 "Rosemarie" (1969 Mono Mix) (Dolenz) - 2:31 
 "Changes" (1968 Mono Mix) (Jones, Pitts) - 2:35 
 "Good Clean Fun" (Mono Mix) (Nesmith) - 2:18 
 "Through the Looking Glass" (Fuzz Guitar Version - Mono Mix) (Baldwin, Boyce, Hart) - 2:49 
 "All the Grey Haired Men" (Mono Backing Track) (Keller, Russell) - 2:23 
 "War Games" (1968 Mono Mix) (Jones, Pitts) - 2:50 
 "Propinquity" (I've Just Begun to Care) (Mono Mix) (Nesmith) - 3:19 
 "My Share of the Sidewalk" (Version 2 - Mono Backing Tracks) (Nesmith) - 2:51 
 "Party" (1968 Mono Mix) (Jones, Pitts) - 3:06 
 "The Crippled Lion" (Mono Mix) (Nesmith) - 2:50 
 "If I Ever Get to Saginaw Again" (Mono Backing Track) (Keller, Russell) - 2:50 
 "Some of Shelly's Blues" (1968 Mono Mix) (Nesmith) - 2:30 
 "Smile" (1968 Mono Mix) (Jones) - 2:23 
 "Nine Times Blue" (Mono Mix) (Nesmith) - 2:06 
 
Disc 3 (Sessions)

 "Through the Looking Glass" (Backing Track - Take 11) (Baldwin, Boyce, Hart) - 2:49 
 "Don't Listen to Linda" (Backing Track - Takes 1–3) (Boyce, Hart) - 4:22 
 "I Won't Be the Same Without Her" (Backing Track - Take 1) (Goffin, King) - 3:58 
 "Carlisle Wheeling" (Backing Track - Take 1) (Nesmith) - 3:36 
 "Nine Times Blue" (Backing Track - Take 6) (Nesmith) - 2:21 
 "Look Down" (Backing Track - Take 1) (King, Stern) - 3:27 
 "Just a Game" (Backing Track - Takes 1–2) (Dolenz) - 3:09 
 "You and I" (Backing Track - Take 1) (Chadwick, Jones) - 2:32 
 "That's What It's Like Loving You" (Backing Track - Take 1) (Jones, Pitts) - 3:03 
 "Smile" (Backing Track - Take 1) (Jones) - 2:31 
 "A Man Without a Dream" (Backing Track - Take 1) (Goffin, King) - 3:21 
 "A Man Without a Dream" (Alternate Vocal - Take 14) (Goffin, King) - 3:55 
 "Someday Man" (Backing Track - Take 1) (Nichols, Williams) - 3:23 
 "Someday Man" (Alternate Mix) (Nichols, Williams) - 3:25 
 "(I Prithee) Do Not Ask for Love" (1968 Backing Track - Take 12) (Michael Martin Murphey) - 3:05 
 "I Go Ape" (Backing Track - Take 10) (Sedaka) - 2:21 
 "Wind Up Man (Backing Track - Take 1) (Bill Dorsey) - 1:09 
 "String for My Kite" (Version 1 Backing Track - Take 1) (Dorsey) - 1:09 
 "Naked Persimmon" (Backing Track - Take 1) (Nesmith) - 2:03 
 "Goldie Locks Sometime" (Backing Track - Take 4) (Dorsey) - 3:29 
 "String for My Kite" (Version 2 Backing Track - Take 1) (Dorsey) - 1:13 
 "Darwin" (Backing Track - Take 2) (Dorsey) - 0:52 
 "St. Matthew" (Alternate Vocal) (Nesmith) - 2:47 
 "Don't Wait for Me" (Alternate Stereo Mix) (Nesmith) - 2:39 
 "Rosemarie" (Alternate Stereo Mix) (Dolenz) - 2:36 
 "(I Prithee) Do Not Ask for Love" (1968 Mono Soundtrack Master) (Murphey) - 2:24 
 "Naked Persimmon" (1968 Mono Soundtrack Master) (Nesmith) - 2:36 
 "Goldie Locks Sometime" (1968 Mono Soundtrack Master) (Dorsey) - 2:17 
 "Darwin" (1968 Mono Soundtrack Master) (Dorsey) - 0:41 
 "I Go Ape" (1968 Mono Soundtrack Master) (Sedaka) - 2:12

7" Vinyl 45

Side 1: I Go Ape (Acetate Version) (Sedaka, Greenfield) - 2:53
Side 2: (I Prithee) Do Not Ask for Love (Acetate Version) (Murphey) - 2:24

Session information

Through the Looking Glass
Written by Red Baldwin, Tommy Boyce and Bobby Hart
Lead vocal: Micky Dolenz
Guitar: Keith Allison, Wayne Erwin, Gerry McGee, Louie Shelton
Bass: Joe Osborn
Drums: Billy Lewis
Tack piano: Bobby Hart
Strings/horns: Unknown
Produced by Tommy Boyce and Bobby Hart
Originally recorded during sessions for More of the Monkees (1967). This version recorded for The Birds, The Bees & The Monkees (1968) but later rejected.
Recorded at United Recorders, Hollywood, California, December 30, 1967, and December 20, 1968

Don't Listen to Linda
Written by Tommy Boyce and Bobby Hart
Lead vocal: Davy Jones
Guitar: Tommy Boyce, Gerry McGee, Louie Shelton
Bass: Joe Osborn
Drums: Billy Lewis
Strings/horns: Unknown
Produced by Tommy Boyce and Bobby Hart
Originally recorded during sessions for More of the Monkees. This version recorded for The Birds, The Bees & The Monkees but later rejected.
Recorded at United Recorders, Hollywood, California, December 31, 1967, and December 20, 1968

I Won't Be the Same Without Her
Written by Gerry Goffin and Carole King
Lead/backing vocal: Michael Nesmith
Harmony vocal: Bill Chadwick
Guitar/dano bass: Peter Tork, James Burton, Glen Campbell, Al Casey, Mike Deasey
Bass: Bob West
Drums: Hal Blaine
Percussion: Gary Coleman, Frank DeVito
Piano: Larry Knechtel
Produced by Michael Nesmith
Recorded at RCA Victor Studios, Hollywood, California, July 18, 1966 (8:00 P.M.-12:00 A.M.), during sessions for The Monkees (1966)

Just a Game
Written by Micky Dolenz
Lead vocal: Micky Dolenz
Backing vocal: Coco Dolenz
Acoustic guitar: Micky Dolenz, Tommy Tedesco
Bass: Max Bennett
Drums: Jim Gordon
Percussion: Joe Porcaro
Harpsichord: Michel Rubini
Violin: George Berres, Anatol Kaminsky, Bernard Kundell, Erno Neufeld, Nathan Ross, Joseph Stepansky
Cello: Armand Kaproff, Justin DiTullio, Edgar Lustgarten
Trumpet: Bud Brisbois, Buddy Childers, Oliver Mitchell, Ray Triscari
French horn: Vincent DeRosa, David Duke, Dick Perissi
Trombone: George Roberts
Flute: Ronnie Lang, Ted Nash, Bud Shank
Produced by Micky Dolenz
Written during sessions for Headquarters (1967)
Recorded at Western Recorders Studio #1, Hollywood, California; April 9 and June 7, 1968, during sessions for The Birds, The Bees & The Monkees

Me Without You
Written by Tommy Boyce and Bobby Hart
Lead vocal by Davy Jones
Guitar: Gerry McGee, Louie Shelton
Bass: Joe Osborn
Drums: Billy Lewis
Keyboard: Bobby Hart
Backing vocal/horn/calliope/tambourine: Unknown
Produced by Tommy Boyce and Bobby Hart
Recorded at United Recorders, Hollywood, California, February 3 and December 20, 1968

Don't Wait for Me
Written by Michael Nesmith
Lead vocal by Michael Nesmith
Acoustic Guitar: Harold Bradley
Steel Guitar: Lloyd Green
Bass: Bobby Dyson
Banjo: Sonny Osborne
Drums: Jerry Carrigan
Organ: David Briggs
Produced by Michael Nesmith and Felton Jarvis
Recorded at RCA Victor Studios, Nashville, Tennessee, May 29, 1968

You and I
Written by Bill Chadwick and David Jones
Lead vocal by Davy Jones
Backing vocal: Davy Jones
Guitars: Bill Chadwick, Gerry McGee, Louie Shelton, Neil Young
Bass: Joe Osborn
Drums: Hal Blaine
Organ: Larry Knechtel
Produced by Davy Jones
Recorded at Wally Heider's, May 10; Sunset Sound, June 19, 21; and RCA Victor Studios, Hollywood, California, September 20, 1968

While I Cry
Written and produced by Michael Nesmith
Lead vocal/acoustic guitar: Michael Nesmith
Backing vocal: Bill Chadwick
Bass: Rick Dey
Drums: Eddie Hoh
Unknown: Keith Allison, Bill Chadwick, Harry Nilsson
Recorded at RCA Victor Studios, Hollywood, California, January 14–15, 1968

Tear Drop City
Written by Tommy Boyce and Bobby Hart
Lead vocal by Micky Dolenz
Backing vocals: Tommy Boyce, Bobby Hart, Ron Hicklin
Guitar: Wayne Erwin, Gerry McGee, Louie Shelton
Bass: Larry Taylor
Drums: Billy Lewis
Percussion: Gene Estes
Produced by Tommy Boyce and Bobby Hart
The song was sped up from the original recording, changing the key from G to A-flat
Recorded at RCA Victor Studios, Hollywood, California, October 26, 1966, during sessions for More of the Monkees

The Girl I Left Behind Me
Written by Carole Bayer Sager and Neil Sedaka
Lead vocal: Davy Jones
Backing vocal: Unknown
Guitar: Al Gafa, Willard Suyker, Don Thomas
Bass: Russ Savakus
Drums: Herb Lovelle
Keyboard: Neil Sedaka
Violin: Leo Kahn, Julius Schachter
Cello: Maurice Bialkin
Produced by Carole Bayer Sager and Neil Sedaka
Recorded at Western Recorders, Studio 2, February 6; and RCA Victor Studios, Hollywood, California, February 9, 1968

A Man Without a Dream
Written by Gerry Goffin and Carole King
Lead vocal: Davy Jones
Backing vocals: Davy Jones, Don Addrisi
Guitar: Unknown
Acoustic guitars: Mike Deasy, Tommy Tedesco
Bass: Joe Osborn
Drums: Hal Blaine
Tambourine: Hal Blaine
Piano: Larry Knechtel, Jimmy Rowles
Trumpet: Conte Candoli, Buddy Childers 
French horn: Jim Decker, Vincent DeRosa, Bill Hinshaw, Dick Perissi
Trombone: Bob Edmondson, Lew McCreary
Produced by Bones Howe
The song was originally attempted during the sessions for Pisces, Aquarius, Capricorn & Jones Ltd. (1967)
Recorded at Wally Heider's Studio #3, November 7, 1968; and Western Recorders, Hollywood, California; January 10, 1969

Shorty Blackwell
Written by Micky Dolenz
Lead/backing vocals: Micky Dolenz, Coco Dolenz
Electric 12-String guitar: Tommy Tedesco
Bass: Max Bennett
Drums/mallet/timpani: Jim Gordon
Piano: Micky Dolenz, Michel Rubini
Violin: George Berres, Anatol Kaminsky, Bernard Kundell, Erno Neufeld, Nathan Ross, Joseph Stepansky
Cellos: Justin DiTullio, Armand Kaproff, Edgar Lustgarten
Trumpet: Bud Brisbois, Buddy Childers, and Oliver Mitchell, Ray Triscari
French horn: Vincent DeRosa, David Duke, Dick Perissi
Trombones: George Roberts, Kenny Shroyer
Flute: Ronnie Lang, Ted Nash, Bud Shank
Unknown: Bill Chadwick
Produced by Micky Dolenz
Recorded at RCA Victor Studios, January 19 and February 15; United Recorders, February 4; and Western Recorders Studio 1, Hollywood, California, April 9, 30, May 2, and June 7, 1968

1995 bonus tracks session Information

Someday Man
Written by Roger Nichols and Paul Williams
Lead vocal by Davy Jones
Backing vocal: Don Addrisi
Electric guitar: Unknown
Guitars: Mike Deasy, Tommy Tedesco
Bass: Joe Osborn
Drums: Hal Blaine
Percussion: Hal Blaine
Piano: Larry Knechtel, Jimmy Rowles
Trumpet: Conte Candoli, Buddy Childers
French horn: Jim Decker, Vincent DeRosa, Bill Hinshaw, Dick Perissi
Trombones: Bob Edmondson, Lew McCreary
Produced by Bones Howe
Recorded at Wally Heider's Studio 3, November 7, 1968; and Western Recorders, Hollywood, California, January 10, 1969

Carlisle Wheeling [second recorded version]
Written and produced by Michael Nesmith
Lead vocal/guitar: Michael Nesmith
Bass: Chip Douglas
Pedal steel guitar: Orville "Red" Rhodes
Second known recording of "Carlisle Wheeling;" first version released on Missing Links (1987), Listen to the Band (1991) and Music Box (2001). Rerecorded by Nesmith with the First National Band on Loose Salute (1970) and retitled "Conversations".
Recorded at RCA Victor Studios, Hollywood, California, April 5, 1968

Rosemarie [first recorded version]
Written and produced by Micky Dolenz
Lead vocal by Micky Dolenz
Other personnel unknown
Later version released on Missing Links
Recorded at RCA Victor Studios, Hollywood, California, March 1, 1968

Smile
Written and produced by Davy Jones
Lead vocals: Davy Jones
Backing vocals: Davy Jones and unknown
Electric guitar: Neil Young
Acoustic guitar: Gerry McGee
Bass: Joe Osborn
Drums: Hal Blaine
Electric piano: Larry Knechtel
Later released on Music Box
Originally considered for, but rejected from, Changes (1970)
Recorded at Wally Heider's, Hollywood, California, May 10, 1968

St. Matthew [early mix]
Written/produced by Michael Nesmith
Lead vocal/electric guitar: Michael Nesmith
Guitar: Harold Bradley, Wayne Moss 
Steel Guitar: Lloyd Green
Bass: Norbert Putnam
Banjo: Bobby Thompson
Drums: Jerry Carrigan
Percussion/organ: Unknown
Piano: David Briggs
Violin: Buddy Spicher
Later mix released on Missing Links Volume Two.
Recorded at RCA Victor Studios, Nashville, Tennessee; June 2, 1968
Earlier version recorded at RCA Victor Studios, Hollywood, California, February 8, 1968.

Me Without You [alternate mix]
A different mix of the song, featuring a fuzz guitar

Through the Looking Glass [early mix]
Lacks remixing from December 20, 1968
Recorded at United Recorders, Hollywood, California, December 30, 1967

Charts

Album

Single

References

The Monkees albums
1969 albums
RCA Records albums
Rhino Records albums
Colgems Records albums
Albums produced by Micky Dolenz
Albums produced by Michael Nesmith
Albums produced by Tommy Boyce
Albums produced by Bobby Hart
Albums produced by Neil Sedaka
Albums produced by Carole Bayer Sager
Albums recorded at United Western Recorders